According to traditional Chinese uranography, the modern constellation Sextans is located within the southern quadrant of the sky, which is symbolized as The Vermillion Bird of the South (南方朱雀, Nán Fāng Zhū Què).

The name of the western constellation in modern Chinese is 六分仪座 (liù fēn yí zuò), meaning "the six-part apparatus constellation".

Stars
The map of Chinese constellation in constellation Sextans area consists of:

See also
Traditional Chinese star names
Chinese constellations

References

External links
Sextans – Chinese associations
 香港太空館研究資源
 中國星區、星官及星名英譯表
 天象文學
 台灣自然科學博物館天文教育資訊網
 中國古天文
 中國古代的星象系統

Astronomy in China
Sextans (constellation)